The Morrilton Commercial Historic District encompasses the historic central business district of Morrilton, Arkansas.  The L-shaped district includes two blocks of East Railroad and East Broadway, between Division and Chestnut Streets, and three blocks of Division and Chestnut Streets, between Broadway and Vine.  This area was mostly developed between 1880 and the 1920s, and was heavily influenced by the railroad, which passes between Broadway and Railroad.  Prominent buildings in the district include the Morrilton Post Office, Morrilton Railroad Station, First National Bank of Morrilton, and the Coca-Cola Building.

The district was listed on the National Register of Historic Places in 2003.

See also
National Register of Historic Places listings in Conway County, Arkansas

References

External links

Historic districts on the National Register of Historic Places in Arkansas
National Register of Historic Places in Conway County, Arkansas
Mission Revival architecture in Arkansas
Buildings and structures in Morrilton, Arkansas